La Chapelle-Réanville is a former commune in the Eure department in northern France. On 1 January 2017, it was merged into the new commune La Chapelle-Longueville.

Population

Nancy Cunard, English heiress to the Cunard Line, activist and writer, moved into a small farmhouse, Le Puits Carré (The Four-Cornered Well), just outside the village in 1928. Soon after this Henry Crowder, American Jazz musician, came to stay with Cunard when she relocated her Hours Press to the farm's outbuildings.  She removed the press to Paris in 1930 but continued to own the farmhouse with frequent visits.  Looted by German soldiers in the Second World War while Cunard was in London, she sold the property after the liberation.  Later the main house was destroyed by fire and the site remains abandoned.

See also
Communes of the Eure department

References

External links

Official site

Former communes of Eure